A layout boat is a low-profile un-motorized oval-like boat that is used by diver duck hunters to hide in when hunting in open water. They are unique to a specialized form of waterfowl hunting called Layout hunting. Most layout boats are used for diver duck or ocean duck hunting where open deep water waterfowl species frequent. Sometimes they are deployed in marshes for more traditional puddle duck hunting or goose hunting. Layout boats come in designs such as pumpkin seed, oval, and box like just to name a few. They come in one- and two-man models. These boats are painted to match the color of the water and sit very low in the water.  The main focus of the layout boat is to put the hunter very close to the decoys if not in them for additional concealment. This makes for very dramatic hunting scenarios where a decoying bird comes extremely close to the hunter and boat.  They are used to target diver ducks such as bluebills (greater scaup), canvasback, goldeneye, scoters and eider to name a few. This is because divers often fly low on the water and will not notice the low sides of the boat. Layout boats are often placed within the decoy spread, so the decoys help further conceal the sides of the boat.

References

Sternberg, Dick - Simpson,Jeff (1997). The Complete Hunter: Duck Hunting 
Smith, Nick (2006). Waterfowl Hunting: Ducks and Geese of North America
Kramer, Gary (2003). A Ducks Unlimited Guide to Hunting Diving & Sea Ducks
DeVore, Michael (2013). Lake Saint Clair Sportsman

Boat types